Francis Xavier Atencio, also known as X Atencio (September 4, 1919 – September 10, 2017) was an American animator and Imagineer for The Walt Disney Company. He is perhaps best known for writing the scripts and song lyrics of the Disney theme park attractions, Pirates of the Caribbean and The Haunted Mansion.

Biography
Atencio was born in Walsenburg, Colorado in 1919. He was a Disney artist from 1938 to 1965, when he became an Imagineer to help design the Disneyland Railroad's Primeval World diorama segment. He then contributed to various Disney attractions. He wrote the scripts for Adventure Thru Inner Space and Pirates of the Caribbean. For the latter, he also penned the lyrics of "Yo Ho (A Pirate's Life for Me)" and provided the voices of various characters, including the talking skull that appears before the waterfall that carries riders into the main body of the attraction and the drunken pirate on the bridge who heckles the auctioneer

He also wrote the script for the Haunted Mansion, and the lyrics of its theme song, "Grim Grinning Ghosts (The Screaming Song)." His voice can also be heard emanating from the coffin in the Mansion's conservatory scene. In the Disneyland Mansion, it is Atencio who reads the emergency spiel when the ride comes to a halt.

Another brief voice-over Atencio provided was for the Submarine Voyage Thru Liquid Space, where he is addressed as "Bridge." He also wrote the lyrics to Buddy Baker's music for the retired Magic Kingdom attraction If You Had Wings.

Atencio served as a photo interpreter in the U.S. Army Air Forces from 1941 to 1945 during World War II, reaching the rank of captain in the 2nd Photo Tech Squadron. Stationed in England, he was part of a team that analyzed aerial surveillance.

He retired from The Walt Disney Company in 1984 and was named a Disney Legend in 1996. He died in Los Angeles, California on September 10, 2017, six days after his 98th birthday. His great-nephew is television and film director Peter Atencio.

References

Further reading
 Surrell, Jason. (2003). The Haunted Mansion: From the Magic Kingdom to the Movies. New York: Disney Editions. . Describes X Atencio's contributions to The Haunted Mansion.
 Surrell, Jason. (2005). Pirates of the Caribbean: From the Magic Kingdom to the Movies. New York: Disney Editions. . Describes X Atencio's contributions to Pirates of the Caribbean.

External links
 Official Disney Legends Website
 
 

1919 births
2017 deaths
Animators from Colorado
American lyricists
Animation screenwriters
People from Walsenburg, Colorado
Military personnel from Colorado
United States Army Air Forces officers
United States Army Air Forces personnel of World War II
First Motion Picture Unit personnel
Walt Disney Animation Studios people
Disney imagineers
Burials at Holy Cross Cemetery, Culver City